Snoops may refer to:

Mr. Snoops, one of the antagonists of the movie The Rescuers
Snoops (1989 TV series)
Snoops (1999 TV series)